Indiana Township is a township in Allegheny County, Pennsylvania and a Pittsburgh suburb located in the United States. The population was 7,254 at the 2020 census.

Indiana Township was named after the Indiana Territory.

Geography

Streams
Deer Creek flows through the township.

The township contains the following communities: Dorseyville, Indianola, Rural Ridge, and Fox Chapel.

Surrounding neighborhoods
Indiana Township has seven borders, including West Deer Township to the north, Frazer Township to the east, Harmar Township and Fox Chapel to the south, O'Hara Township to the southwest and Shaler and Hampton Townships to the west.

Demographics

As of the census of 2000, there were 6,809 people, 2,347 households, and 1,828 families residing in the township.  The population density was 384.2 people per square mile (148.4/km2).  There were 2,457 housing units at an average density of 138.6/sq mi (53.5/km2).  The racial makeup of the township was 95.67% White, 1.29% African American, 0.06% Native American, 2.16% Asian, 0.03% Pacific Islander, 0.31% from other races, and 0.48% from two or more races. Hispanic or Latino of any race were 0.54% of the population.

There were 2,347 households, out of which 38.0% had children under the age of 18 living with them, 66.0% were married couples living together, 8.5% had a female householder with no husband present, and 22.1% were non-families. 18.7% of all households were made up of individuals, and 8.7% had someone living alone who was 65 years of age or older.  The average household size was 2.74 and the average family size was 3.14.

In the township the population was spread out, with 27.2% under the age of 18, 5.0% from 18 to 24, 26.5% from 25 to 44, 25.3% from 45 to 64, and 16.1% who were 65 years of age or older.  The median age was 41 years. For every 100 females there were 96.7 males.  For every 100 females age 18 and over, there were 92.8 males.

The median income for a household in the township was $55,168, and the median income for a family was $65,110. Males had a median income of $50,481 versus $33,914 for females. The per capita income for the township was $27,068.  About 4.2% of families and 6.4% of the population were below the poverty line, including 8.0% of those under age 18 and 3.3% of those age 65 or over.

Government and Politics

Presidential Elections Results

Township Board of Supervisors

 [2017-2019] Republicans-5 (Schurko, Krally, Taylor, Kaan, Jorgensen), Democrats-0

Communities
Dorseyville
Indianola

Education
The township is within the Fox Chapel Area School District.

Notable person
 Shooby Taylor (1929-2003); scat singer, was born in Indiana Township

References

External links
 Indiana Township official website

Townships in Allegheny County, Pennsylvania